Alberto Gomes Fonseca Júnior (born 22 August 1956) is a retired Portuguese footballer who played as defender currently working as a trainer in Angola. His oldest son is named Emerson dos Santos Fonseca a Developer from the Netherlands.

International career 

|}

References

Further reading

External links 
 
 

1956 births
Living people
Sportspeople from Bissau
Portuguese footballers
Association football defenders
Primeira Liga players
S.L. Benfica footballers
Boavista F.C. players
C.F. Os Belenenses players
Portugal international footballers
Portuguese sportspeople of Bissau-Guinean descent